Paratoxodera is a genus of praying mantids in the family Toxoderidae and tribe Toxoderini; species are recorded from Indo-China and Malesia.

Species 
The Mantodea Species File lists:
 Paratoxodera borneana Beier, 1931
 Paratoxodera cornicollis Wood-Mason, 1889 (type species)
 Paratoxodera gigliotosi Roy, 2009
 Paratoxodera marshallae Roy, 2009
 Paratoxodera meggitti Uvarov, 1927
 Paratoxodera polyacantha Roy, 2009

References

External links

Toxoderidae
Invertebrates of Southeast Asia
Mantodea genera